Bryotropha hulli is a moth of the family Gelechiidae. It is found in Croatia, North Macedonia, Bulgaria, mainland Greece, the Aegean Islands, Crete, Cyprus, Turkey, Syria and Israel.

The wingspan is 9–11 mm. The forewings are brown to dark greyish brown, mottled with ochreous. The hindwings are very pale brown at the base and much darker towards the apex. Adults have been recorded on wing from late April to early November in several generations per year.

Etymology
The species is named after Mr. M. Hull who offered numerous specimens of Bryotropha species, among them a large sample of this species, to the authors.

References

Moths described in 2005
hulli
Moths of Europe
Moths of Asia